BOD (4-methyl-2,5,β-trimethoxyphenethylamine) is a lesser-known psychedelic drug.  It is the beta-methoxy analog of 2C-D. BOD was first synthesized by Alexander Shulgin. In his book PiHKAL, the dosage range is listed as 15–25 mg, and the duration listed as 8–16 hours. BOD produces strongly distorted open-eye visuals, and some closed-eye visuals. It also has an entheogenic effect and produces humor. Very little data exists about the pharmacological properties, metabolism, and toxicity of BOD.

Legality

United Kingdom
This substance is a Class A drug in the Drugs controlled by the UK Misuse of Drugs Act.

See also 
 BOB
 BOH
 BOHD
 Phenethylamine
 Psychedelics, dissociatives and deliriants

References

Psychedelic phenethylamines
Phenylethanolamine ethers
Designer drugs